The Izvorul Alb is a right tributary of the river Moldova in Romania. It flows into the Moldova in Câmpulung Moldovenesc.

References

Rivers of Romania
Rivers of Suceava County